Mukim Telisai is a mukim in Tutong District, Brunei. The population was 10,095 in 2016.

Name 
The mukim is named after Kampong Telisai, one of the villages it encompasses.

Geography 
The mukim is located in the western part of Tutong District, bordering the South China Sea to the north, Mukim Pekan Tutong to the north-east, Mukim Tanjong Maya to the east, Mukim Ukong to the south-east, and Mukim Bukit Sawat and Mukim Liang in Belait District to the south and south-west respectively.

Demographics 
As of 2016 census, the population was 10,095 with  males and  females. The mukim had 1,768 households occupying 1,768 dwellings. The entire population lived in rural areas.

Villages 
As of 2016, the mukim comprised the following census villages:

Notes

References 

Telisai
Tutong District